World War One is an American documentary television series that was shown on CBS during the 1964–1965 television season to commemorate the fiftieth anniversary of the start of the war.

The series, which was produced by CBS News and featured 26 half-hour episodes, was narrated by Robert Ryan. The original music score was composed by Morton Gould, and performed by Alfredo Antonini conducting the CBS Symphony Orchestra.

World War One premiered on Tuesday nights at 8 pm Eastern Time. Mid-season it was moved to Sunday nights at 6:30 pm. Ratings competition from the second half-hour of ABC's Combat! and the second half-hour of NBC's Mr. Novak may have precipitated this time slot change.

Re-released in 1995, the series is available on video tape and DVD but no US video-on-demand services have it. The series is available on YouTube.

Overview 
The series begins with a review of the rivalries and tensions between the major European powers from 1870 to 1914, which culminated with the assassination of Archduke Franz Ferdinand and his wife Sophie in the city of Sarajevo by members of the Serbian Black Hand.

The series then followed the course of the war, showing how more countries both in and out of Europe, such as Japan, the Ottoman Empire, Bulgaria, Romania and the United States, became involved in the war, as well as the war's various fighting fronts and campaigns.

Various episodes examined the German atrocities in Belgium, the war at sea, trench warfare, the Russian Revolution, the Italian Front, air warfare, America's entry into the war, the home fronts of the various participants, the music of that era, the war's final campaigns, and the war's legacy.

Content 
The series used archival footage from various national and private archives, some of which were at that point being seen by the public for the first time.

Rather than use sound effects to simulate combat noises, the series used original incidental music written by Morton Gould, performed by the CBS Symphony Orchestra under the direction of Alfredo Antonini.

Re-released in 1995, the series is available on video tape and DVD.

The series is not available for viewing on video on demand services like Hulu.

Episode list
 The Summer of Sarajevo (Original Air Date—22 September 1964)
 The Clash of the Generals (Original Air Date—29 September 1964)
 The Doomed Dynasties (Original Air Date—6 October 1964)
 Atrocity 1914 (Original Air Date—13 October 1964)
 They Sank the Lusitania (Original Air Date—27 October 1964)
 Verdun the Inferno (Original Air Date—10 November 1964)
 The Battle of Jutland (Original Air Date—17 November 1964)
 The Trenches (Original Air Date—24 November 1964)
 D-Day at Gallipoli (Original Air Date—1 December 1964)
 America the Neutral (Original Air Date—8 December 1964)
 Wilson and the War (Original Air Date—20 December 1964)
 Revolution in Red (Original Air Date—27 December 1964)
 Behind the German Lines (Original Air Date—3 January 1965)
 Year of Lost Illusions (Original Air Date—10 January 1965)
 Over There (Original Air Date—17 January 1965)
 Over Here (Original Air Date—24 January 1965)
 Daredevils and Dogfights (Original Air Date—31 January 1965)
 The Agony of Caporetto (Original Air Date—14 February 1965)
 Tipperary and All That Jazz (Original Air Date—21 February 1965)
 The Promised Lands (Original Air Date—28 February 1965)
 The Tide Turns (Original Air Date—7 March 1965)
 The Battle of Argonne (Original Air Date—14 March 1965)
 The Day the Guns Stopped Firing (Original Air Date—28 March 1965)
 Wilson and Peace (Original Air Date—4 April 1965)
 The Allies in Russia (Original Air Date—11 April 1965)
 Heritage of War (Original Air Date—18 April 1965)

See also
 The Great War - BBC TV production (1964)
 The World at War - Thames Television production (1973)
 The Great War - PBS production (2017)

References

External links
 

1964 American television series debuts
1965 American television series endings
1960s American documentary television series
CBS original programming
Documentary television series about World War I
Documentary films about World War I
Cultural depictions of Archduke Franz Ferdinand of Austria
Cultural depictions of Gavrilo Princip